Isoneuromyia semirufa is a Palearctic species of  'fungus gnat' in the family Mycetophilidae. As larvae, the members of this genus are web spinners that are chiefly associated with dead wood where they feed on fungal hyphae. They can also be found in turf, grass tussocks, under logs and boulders, in worm tunnels, and among mosses and liverworts. They were discovered in 2006 in  China: Zhejiang province: Wuyanling National Natural Reserve, Yiping Wang along with 3 Isoneuromyia  Isoneuromyia baumhaueri, Isoneuromyia signata and  orfelia semirufa

References

External links 
Images representing  Isoneuromyia semirufa at BOLD

Keroplatidae